Vantonio Bernard Bowick (born October 3, 1966) is a former American football player who played in the National Football League (NFL) for the Atlanta Falcons and a former Arena Football League player with a 13-season career.

Bowick attended Slocomb High School in Slocomb, Alabama and was a student and letterman in football, basketball, and baseball. Bowick played alongside former New York Jets running back Brad Baxter. He continued on to play college football at the University of Tennessee at Chattanooga.

Tony Bowick played one season with the Atlanta Falcons in the NFL (1989) and one season with the Birmingham Fire in the WLAF (1991–1992). He played 13 seasons in  the AFL: Charlotte Rage (1993–1995), Albany Firebirds (1996–1997), Grand Rapids Rampage (1998–2001, 2005), Chicago Rush (2002–2003), Austin Wranglers (2004).

References

External links
 NFL stats
 AFL stats

1966 births
Living people
American football defensive linemen
American football offensive linemen
Albany Firebirds players
Atlanta Falcons players
Austin Wranglers players
Birmingham Fire players
Charlotte Rage players
Chattanooga Mocs football players
Chicago Rush players
Grand Rapids Rampage players
Sportspeople from Dothan, Alabama
Players of American football from Alabama